Tracey Ullman's Visible Panty Lines is American talk show and reality television series hosted by Tracey Ullman. The show focuses on fashion and individual style. Each episode consists of makeovers and celebrity guests. Celebrities reveal what's in their wardrobe and present childhood mementos. The show was inspired by Ullman's online fashion boutique Purple Skirt. The series was originally set to air on 13 September 2001, but due to the September 11 attacks the show was bumped to September 20.

Background
After the conclusion of her HBO sketch comedy series, Tracey Takes On... (1996–99), Tracey Ullman decided to take a step back from television, citing exhaustion from years of having to wear heavy prosthetic makeup for her many television characters. In 1999, she signed on for Woody Allen's film Small Time Crooks, as well as the film Panic. Despite making a conscious decision to move away from television, she announced her intent to someday return. She hoped to create a new comedy series, one in which she would play a few characters with minimal makeup. In the meantime, Ullman busied herself with her online fashion-focused boutique and blog, Purple Skirt, which she had launched in 1999. In 2001, she decided to spin-off the website into a fashion talk show and reality show for the Oxygen television network, co-founded by American talk show host, Oprah Winfrey in 2001. Tracey Ullman's Visible Panty Lines, a show showcasing fashion and style advice from industry experts, along with sit-down interviews with celebrities discussing their own personal style, debuted in September 2001. The show ran for two seasons.

Episodes

Season 1 (2001)

Season 2 (2002)

References

External links
 
 Oxygen falls for Ullman's 'Lines'

2000s American television talk shows
2001 American television series debuts
2002 American television series endings
Oxygen (TV channel) original programming
Makeover reality television series
Fashion-themed reality television series
Tracey Ullman